The Iran men's national field hockey team is the national field hockey team of Iran. It is governed by the Hockey Federation of the Islamic Republic of Iran.

History
Iran took part as hosts in the 1974 Asian Games where Iran occupied the sixth and last place losing to eventual champions Pakistan 13–0.

Iran also took part in the 1985 Asia Cup held in Dhaka, Bangladesh where Iran came last in the 10-nation event again suffering a heavy 16–0 defeat at the hands of again eventual winners Pakistan.

More recently Iran has enjoyed success at the indoor event, winning Indoor Hockey Asia Cup on four occasions and also participated at 2011 Men's Indoor Hockey World Cup and 2015 Men's Indoor Hockey World Cup. In 2015 Men's World Cup, Iran made a history and advanced to semifinals by hammering Russia 8–5. In semifinals, it lost the game to Austria and Germany and finished the tournament in 4th place.

Tournament records

Asian Games

Asian Cup

West Asian Cup

AHF Cup

Indoor hockey results

World Cup

Asian Cup

Asian Indoor Games

References

External links
  Iran Hockey Federation

National team
Field hockey
Asian men's national field hockey teams
Men's sport in Iran